Josep Roig Boada (born 6 August 1957 in Terrassa, Spain) is a Spanish music composer, producer and sound engineer. He owns Temps Record company.

Biography

Studies and professional career 
During his early years, Roig studied Spanish guitar lessons with Emilio Gorrita, violin lessons with Josep Mª Alpiste, Alberto Licy and Josep Lluís Puig, harmony lessons with Pere Casas and Angel Soler and also attended a course of music language in cinema with José Nieto. Roig became a professional musician. He used to play the violin and the Spanish guitar in concerts of several singers, groups or orchestras.

In 1979, when he was 22, Roig started his career as a composer, creating the soundtrack for Vida de perros, a short film directed by Josep Lluís Viciana.

Since the beginning of his career, Roig has collaborated many times with audiovisual director Josep Lluís Viciana as a soundtrack composer in well-known series like "Connie the Cow", "The Ugly Duckling" or "The Fruitties".

Apart from the soundtracks, Roig has worked as a sound engineer and music producer in many music albums. His passion for music lead him to create Temps Record, a recording studio and record label located in Terrassa, Spain.

Featured work and awards 
Roig has worked in more than 300 music productions as a sound engineer, music producer and composer. One of these produccions, Lídia Pujol's "Els amants de Lilith", was considered one of the 20 best music releases of 2008 by Womex.

As for soundtracks, Roig has mostly worked for Spanish production companies, but has also participated in projects originated in Norway, Australia, Malaysia and Canada, among others. "The Ugly Duckling", produced by Neptuno Films in 1997, was the first occidental animated series broadcast in China. Also, "Connie the Cow", produced by the same company in 2000 and exported to USA and Canada, was one of the most awarded series at the 2000 Cannes Film Festiva. Sauthern Star, an Australian company employed Boada in 2005 and 2008, for the creation of the soundtrack of animated series Sea Princesses and Classic Tales, respectively.

Discography as sound engineer 

Note: [+] means Roig worked also as Artistic Producer.

Filmography 
Roig has created the soundtrack for many audiovisual products.

Productions with D'Ocon Films

Productions with Neptuno Films

Other

References

Living people
1957 births
Spanish guitarists
Spanish violinists
Spanish composers
Spanish male composers
People from Terrassa
21st-century violinists
Spanish male guitarists
21st-century male musicians